Gonzalo Robledo (born January 18, 1987 in Laferrere, Argentina) is an Argentine footballer.

Teams
  Banfield 2006-2010
  River Plate Puerto Rico 2010
  Unión Comercio 2011-2012

References
 
 

1987 births
Living people
Argentine footballers
Argentine expatriate footballers
Club Atlético Banfield footballers
Unión Comercio footballers
Club Atlético River Plate Puerto Rico players
Expatriate footballers in Peru
Expatriate footballers in Puerto Rico
Association football defenders